Skälder Bay is a bay in Skåne County, Sweden. It is an inlet of the Kattegat on the western coast of Scania, located between the Bjäre Peninsula to the north (which separates it from Laholm Bay) and the Kullen Peninsula to the south (which separates it from Øresund). The town of Ängelholm is located at the head of the bay.

The bottom is rocky near the northeastern and southwestern shores, but it is mostly sand and clay in the central part.

A portion of the southern shores and waters of the bay are part of the Skälderviken Ramsar site. Designated since 2001, the  site is of national importance for commercial fishing, since it is an important spawning ground, nursery, and feeding area, especially for the Atlantic herring (Clupea harengus), the Atlantic cod (Gadus morhua) and flatfish species. Furthermore, a number of nationally vulnerable bird species such as the ruff (Philomachus pugnax), bar-tailed godwit (Limosa lapponica), and the common kingfisher (Alcedo atthis) breed and winter there.

References

External links

Bays of Sweden
Landforms of Skåne County
Ramsar sites in Sweden